Rajmund Lehnert (born 14 March 1965) is a German former cyclist. He competed in the team time trial at the 1988 Summer Olympics.

References

External links
 

1965 births
Living people
West German male cyclists
Olympic cyclists of West Germany
Cyclists at the 1988 Summer Olympics
People from Gliwice County
Sportspeople from Silesian Voivodeship